Pang Hak-se (方學世, born 1914 - died 18 July 1992) was a politician from North Korea. After the formal establishment of the Democratic People's Republic of Korea, he was held various position in the North Korean Government including member of the Supreme People's Assembly, the country's unicameral parliament, the Central Committee of the Workers' Party of Korea and later served as the President of the Central Court. He was general manager of the South Korean factors abducted during the Korean War.

Biography
He was either born in 1912, 1913 or 1914 depending on the source. He received professional training in the Soviet Union and worked for the People's Commissariat of Internal Affairs and intelligence agencies. After World War II, he was sent to Korea in October 1945 as a Soviet army captain. From May 1947 Director-General of the People's Committee of North Korea Interior Affairs Bureau.

North Korea
In September 1948, with the declaration on establishment and conducting of first parliamentary election to the Supreme People's Assembly, he was elected as a member of parliament and was appointed Deputy Minister of Internal Affairs and Director of the Political Security Bureau in the Cabinet of North Korea which was led by Premier Kim Il-sung. From March 1951 he served as Minister of Social Security and from October 1952 as Minister of Interior. He continued to support Kim Il Sung after the August Faction Incident, and while most of the Soviet rebels were "returning home" to the Soviet Union, he became one of the few who maintained that position.

He then turned to the legal profession, and was deputy director of the Central Court in November 1960. Since November 1966, he has also been the Information Director of the Workers' Party Liaison Bureau. He was appointed president of the Central Court in December 1972, and was reappointed in April 1982 and December 1986. During the re-election in 1982, he was awarded the Order of Kim Il-sung, and in March 1984, received the Hero of Labor (North Korea). He died on July 18, 1992 while in charge of the Central Court. Pak Song-chol was the chairman of the funeral committee.

In April 1956, November 1970 and October 1980, he was elected as member of the Central Committee of the Workers' Party of Korea.

References

Korean communists
1914 births
1992 deaths
Government ministers of North Korea
Members of the 2nd Central Committee of the Workers' Party of Korea
Members of the 3rd Central Committee of the Workers' Party of Korea
Members of the 4th Central Committee of the Workers' Party of Korea
Members of the 5th Central Committee of the Workers' Party of Korea
Members of the 6th Central Committee of the Workers' Party of Korea
Members of the 1st Supreme People's Assembly
Members of the 2nd Supreme People's Assembly
Members of the 3rd Supreme People's Assembly
Members of the 4th Supreme People's Assembly
Members of the 5th Supreme People's Assembly
Members of the 6th Supreme People's Assembly
Members of the 7th Supreme People's Assembly
Members of the 8th Supreme People's Assembly
Members of the 9th Supreme People's Assembly